The women's 800 metres competition at the 1976 Summer Olympics in Montreal, Quebec, Canada was held at the Olympic Stadium from 23 to 26 July.

Competition format
The competition consisted of heats (Round 1), Semifinals and a Final. The three fastest competitors from each race in the heats plus the next fastest overall qualified for the Semifinals. The four fastest competitors from each of the Semifinal races advanced to the Final.

Records
Prior to the competition, the existing World and Olympic records were as follows.

The top four finishers in the final all went under the existing world record.

Results

Round 1
Qual. rule: first 3 of each heat (Q) plus the next fastest time (q) qualified.

Heat 1

Heat 2

Heat 3

Heat 4

Heat 5

Semifinals

Heat 1

Heat 2

Final

References

External links
 Official Olympic Report , la84foundation.org. Retrieved August 20, 2012. Archive copy from October 7, 2018.

Athletics at the 1976 Summer Olympics
800 metres at the Olympics
1976 in women's athletics
Women's events at the 1976 Summer Olympics